Mi Mero Mole was a Mexican restaurant with two locations in Portland, Oregon, United States.

Description
The restaurant served Mexican cuisine such as burritos, guisados, moles, quesadillas, tacos, and tortillas. The restaurant also served breakfast on weekdays, as of 2019.

History
The original Mi Mero Mole opened on Division Street in southeast Portland's Richmond neighborhood in 2011. Owner Nick Zukin opened a second location in the Old Town Chinatown neighborhood in 2014. The Division restaurant closed in 2017, and the Old Town Chinatown restaurant closed on July 3, 2020, during the COVID-19 pandemic. Zukin had estimated that business was reduced by as much as 80 percent during the pandemic. The restaurant was operating via pickup and delivery, as of April 2020.

The restaurant offered "all you can eat" tacos; the record for most eaten was 14, as of 2016. Zukin received some media attention for his controversial social media interactions.

Reception 
Mi Mero Mole won the best guisados category in Michael Russell's 2018 list of The Oregonian's "8 best tacos within striking distance" of downtown Portland. The restaurant was a favorite of the Unipiper, as of 2020.

See also

 COVID-19 pandemic in Portland, Oregon
 Hispanics and Latinos in Portland, Oregon
 Impact of the COVID-19 pandemic on the restaurant industry in the United States
 List of defunct restaurants of the United States
 List of Mexican restaurants

References

External links
 
 Mi Mero Mole at Fodor's
 Mi Mero Mole at Zomato

2011 establishments in Oregon
2020 disestablishments in Oregon
Defunct Mexican restaurants in the United States
Defunct Latin American restaurants in Portland, Oregon
Mexican restaurants in Portland, Oregon
Northwest Portland, Oregon
Old Town Chinatown
Restaurants disestablished during the COVID-19 pandemic
Restaurants disestablished in 2020
Restaurants established in 2011
Richmond, Portland, Oregon